Ricardo Mello defeated Vincent Spadea 7–6(7–2), 6–3 to win the 2004 Millennium International Tennis Championships singles event. Jan-Michael Gambill was the defending champion.

Seeds

  Vincent Spadea (final)
  Mardy Fish (second round)
  Mario Ančić (semifinals)
  Xavier Malisse (first round)
  Ivo Karlović (first round)
  Cyril Saulnier (first round)
  Max Mirnyi (first round)
  Radek Štěpánek (first round)

Draw

Finals

Top half

Bottom half

External links
 2004 Millennium International Tennis Championships Men's Singles draw

Millennium International Tennis Championships
2004 Millennium International Tennis Championships
Delray Beach Open